FC Polotsk was a Belarusian professional football club based in Polotsk, Vitebsk Oblast, Belarus.

History
The club was founded in 2004 and joined Belarusian Second League the same year. In 2006 they made their debut in Belarusian First League, where they stayed until 2013. 

In September 2013, the club, struggling with financial troubles, announced its withdrawal from the league. They, however, were able to complete the season with youth players, finishing dead last after losing 15 games in a row. The club was officially dissolved in January 2014.

FC Polotsk was reformed in 2019 and rejoined Belarusian Second League in 2020.

Current squad
As of September 2022

External links
FC Polotsk at footballfacts.ru

Football clubs in Belarus
2004 establishments in Belarus
2019 establishments in Belarus
2014 disestablishments in Belarus
Association football clubs established in 2004
Association football clubs established in 2019
Association football clubs disestablished in 2014